The Satara gecko (Hemidactylus sataraensis) is a species of gecko. It is endemic to the Western Ghats, India.

References

Hemidactylus
Reptiles described in 2008
Reptiles of India
Endemic fauna of the Western Ghats